Alberto C. Reynoso (May 14, 1940 – November 22, 2011), also known by his nickname "Big Boy" Reynoso, was a professional basketball player from the Philippines.

During the 1960s to 1970s, Reynoso played in the amateur basketball tournament of the Manila Industrial and Commercial Athletic Association. He later played in the professional Philippine Basketball Association from its formation in 1975 to his retirement. Though he was listed as only being 6'2" in height, he was selected numerous times to play the center position on the country's national basketball team.

References

External links
 
 Big Boy Reynoso official website

1940 births
2011 deaths
Olympic basketball players of the Philippines
Basketball players at the 1968 Summer Olympics
People from Pasig
Basketball players from Metro Manila
Filipino emigrants to the United States
San Beda Red Lions basketball players
Asian Games medalists in basketball
Basketball players at the 1962 Asian Games
Basketball players at the 1966 Asian Games
Basketball players at the 1970 Asian Games
Basketball players at the 1974 Asian Games
Philippines men's national basketball team players
Filipino men's basketball players
1974 FIBA World Championship players
Centers (basketball)
Toyota Super Corollas players
Asian Games gold medalists for the Philippines
Medalists at the 1962 Asian Games